Corbin Brian Burnes (born October 22, 1994) is an American professional baseball pitcher for the Milwaukee Brewers of Major League Baseball (MLB). He was drafted by the Brewers in the fourth round of the 2016 Major League Baseball draft, and made his MLB debut in 2018. He won the National League Cy Young Award in 2021.

Amateur career
Burnes attended Centennial High School in Bakersfield, California. In 2013, his senior year, he had a 9–4 win–loss record with a 2.23 earned run average (ERA) in 22 appearances. After high school, he enrolled and played college baseball at Saint Mary's College of California. In 2015, he played collegiate summer baseball with the Orleans Firebirds of the Cape Cod Baseball League. In 2016, his junior year, he posted a 9–2 record with a 2.48 ERA in 16 starts. After the season, he was drafted by the Milwaukee Brewers in the fourth round of the 2016 Major League Baseball draft.

Professional career
Burnes made his professional debut with the Arizona League Brewers and was later promoted to the Wisconsin Timber Rattlers. In  innings pitched between Arizona and Wisconsin, Burnes posted a 3–0 record with a 2.02 ERA. He started the 2017 season with the Carolina Mudcats and was later promoted to the Biloxi Shuckers after recording a 1.05 ERA after ten starts. Burnes finished 2017 with a combined 8–3 record and 1.67 ERA between both teams. The Brewers named him their minor league pitcher of the year after the season.

2018
MLB.com ranked Burnes as Milwaukee's second-best prospect going into the 2018 season. He began the season with the Colorado Springs Sky Sox. Burnes was called up to the majors for the first time on July 8, 2018, and made his major league debut on July 10, 2018, pitching two scoreless innings, striking out one, and recording his first major league save. In the NLDS against the Colorado Rockies, he pitched four scoreless innings in relief across two appearances, earning the win in the clinching 6–0 Game 3 victory.  He got the last six outs of NLCS game six win against the Dodgers.

2019
To start 2019, it was announced that Burnes would begin the year in the starting rotation. However, he struggled in that role, allowing 11 home runs across his first 3 starts. It was announced he would move back to the bullpen. He continued to struggle in the bullpen, compiling a 9.00 ERA through 26 appearances. He was placed on the injured list on July 15 with shoulder discomfort. He finished the season with a 1–5 record and an 8.82 ERA in 49 innings.

2020
In the shortened 2020 season, Burnes pitched to a 4–1 record and recorded an ERA of 2.11 while striking out 88 batters in  innings. He finished 6th in the NL Cy Young voting that year.

2021
Burnes struck out 40 batters without issuing a walk in his first four starts of 2021, an unprecedented four game stretch for an MLB starting pitcher. On May 13, Burnes set the MLB record for the most strikeouts to begin a season before issuing a walk, with 58, surpassing the previous record held by Kenley Jansen. On August 12, Burnes tied an MLB record after striking out 10 consecutive batters in a game against the Chicago Cubs.

On September 11, Burnes pitched the first eight innings of a combined no-hitter with Josh Hader against the Cleveland Indians, in which he struck out 14 batters. He held a perfect game until a seventh-inning walk to Myles Straw. Burnes finished the 2021 season with an 11–5 record and led the major leagues in ERA (2.43), strikeouts per nine innings (12.6), home runs per nine innings (0.4), and strikeout-to-walk ratio (6.88). He won the National League Cy Young Award, becoming the third Brewers pitcher to win the award. He was also named to the first 2021 All-MLB Team as a starting pitcher.

Making his 2021 postseason debut, Burnes was selected as the starter for Game 1 of the NLDS against the Atlanta Braves. Burnes pitched 6 shutout innings, striking out 6 in the process. He was not credited with the win, however, as he battled in a tight pitchers' duel with Atlanta's Charlie Morton. Milwaukee would, however, win the game 2–1.

2022
On March 22, 2022, Burnes signed a $6.5 million contract with the Brewers, avoiding salary arbitration.

In 2022 he was 12–8 with a 2.94	ERA in 202 innings, and struck out a league-high 243 batters. On defense, he had a .961 fielding percentage. He was a finalist for the NL Gold Glove Award at pitcher, but it was won for the third straight season by Max Fried.

Personal life
Burnes is the son of Rick and Kandi Burnes. Burnes and his wife Brooke were married in 2020. Their first child, a son, was born in 2022.

See also

 List of Major League Baseball no-hitters
 List of Milwaukee Brewers award winners and All-Stars
 List of Milwaukee Brewers no-hitters
 List of people from Bakersfield, California

References

External links

1994 births
Living people
Baseball players from Bakersfield, California
Major League Baseball pitchers
Milwaukee Brewers players
National League All-Stars
National League ERA champions
National League strikeout champions
Saint Mary's Gaels baseball players
Orleans Firebirds players
Arizona League Brewers players
Wisconsin Timber Rattlers players
Carolina Mudcats players
Biloxi Shuckers players
Colorado Springs Sky Sox players
San Antonio Missions players
Cy Young Award winners